A Kodak Photo Spot (also called Kodak Picture Spot or Kodak Photo Point) is a location with a Kodak-sponsored sign indicating a recommended spot from which to take a photograph. They are found in areas popular with tourists, and are particularly common in Disney theme parks. This was until 2012, when the Kodak company filed for bankruptcy, and ended their sponsorship as the camera and film supplier for Disney Parks. In 2013, Nikon became the official sponsor of camera supplies in Disney Parks in the US, and the Kodak Photo Spots were re-branded as Nikon Photo Spots.

One such sign reads, "This location recommended by top photographers to help you tell the story of your visit in pictures."

In a project for the Center for Land Use Interpretation, artists Melinda Stone and Igor Vamos installed "Suggested Photo Spots" signs at various locations across the United States; one of their spots included the wastewater treatment facility for Eastman Kodak's headquarters.

References

External links
 Images of Photo Spots and Picture Spots at Flickr

Photo Spot
Photography
Signage